The Great Western is the debut solo studio album by the Manic Street Preachers vocalist-guitarist James Dean Bradfield. It was released on 24 July 2006 by record label Columbia.

Content 
The majority of the lyrics are written by Bradfield, who had previously only contributed lyrics to the Manic Street Preachers songs "Ocean Spray" and "Firefight". Bradfield's lyrics feature a theme of looking to the past and are largely personal rather than political. Manics bass guitarist-lyricist Nicky Wire contributes lyrics to the song "Bad Boys and Painkillers", and two songs feature lyrics co-written with writer John Niven. Also included is a cover of Jacques Brel's "To See a Friend in Tears". The album features the drummer Dafydd Ieuan from the fellow Welsh band Super Furry Animals on "Run Romeo Run".

The title refers to the Great Western Railway, which is reflected in the album's artwork. Much of the album was written on the train journey between Cardiff and Paddington. Bradfield uses the train journey as a metaphor for soul-searching while away from home. He refers to his journeys between his home in South Wales to London on the GWR in the song "Émigré".

Track listing

Release 
The album spent two weeks in the UK Album Chart, peaking at #22.

Reception 

The Great Western was generally well received by critics.

Stephen Thomas Erlewine of AllMusic opined that the album is the sound of "a sensitive, vulnerable Bradfield, something that hasn't been captured on Manics albums even when they strayed toward colorless mature-pop." The website further described, "Sonically, this album isn't far removed from This Is My Truth Tell Me Yours—it's anthemic yet soft, dramatic yet hushed—but unlike on the Manics albums since, it doesn't sound labored." Q magazine echoed similar sentiments, opining that the album is "even stronger than either of the last two Manics albums [Know Your Enemy and Lifeblood]".

Personnel 
 James Dean Bradfield – lead and backing vocals, lead and rhythm guitar, bass guitar, drums
 Alex Silva – bass guitar
 Nick Nasmyth – keyboards
 Nick Dewey – drums
 Dafydd Ieuan – drums
 Alistair Hamer (Sweet Billy Pilgrim) – drums
 Greg Haver – drums, keyboards
 Dave Eringa – keyboards
 Padlock McKiernan – tin whistle, kazoo

References

External links 
 

2006 debut albums
Albums produced by Dave Eringa
James Dean Bradfield albums
Albums produced by Alex Silva
Albums produced by Greg Haver